01489 is the national dialling code for Hamble Valley in the United Kingdom. 
Before PhONEday the area code was 0489, with the mnemonic HV 9 where HV are taken from the letters H and V in Hamble Valley – an unofficially recognised geographic area surrounding the River Hamble in Hampshire. The dialling code is rarely ever referred to as Hamble Valley (and its name appears to be generally unfamiliar to the residents of the area that it serves), but is instead referred to as Botley, or less frequently (except by residents of the immediate area) as Bishop's Waltham or Locks Heath.
In common with all other British area codes the initial '0' is a trunk prefix that is not required when dialling from abroad.

Coverage
The dialling code contains five telephone exchanges which collectively serve a largely suburban and rural area in the south of Hampshire, straddling the local authorities of Eastleigh, Fareham, and Winchester, but it does not include their town centres.

Settlements served by the dialling code include: Bishop's Waltham, Botley, Corhampton, Curdridge, Droxford, Durley, Hedge End, Locks Heath, Lower Upham, Meonstoke, Segensworth, Soberton, Swanwick, Upham, Waltham Chase, Warsash, Whiteley.

History
Hamble Valley was included in the Fareham charge group along with the 0329 STD code which served Fareham town centre, Stubbington, Titchfield, and Wickham. The Fareham charge group was unusual because it was a dependent charge group of two Group switching centres (GSC). Hamble Valley telephone exchanges with an 0489 STD code were parented onto the Southampton GSC, and Fareham telephone exchanges with an 0329 STD code were parented onto the Portsmouth GSC.

The routing digits for 0489 in distant STD exchanges were the same as those for Southampton (0703) followed by 92. The routing digits for 0329 in distant STD exchanges were the same as those for Portsmouth (0705) followed by 92.

Hamble Valley telephone exchanges were not arranged in a linked numbering scheme, so 0489 was suffixed with a digit identifying the particular exchange. The same suffix digit was also used in local dialling codes from Southampton. 

Hamble valley telephone exchanges gradually became part of a linked numbering scheme during the 1980s with the STD code 0489, and the original 3, 4, and 5 figure numbers became 6 figure, when Strowger telephone exchanges were replaced with digital telephone exchanges.

Calls from the Fareham charge group were charged at local rate to telephone exchanges in the following STD codes:

Telephone exchanges in 0421 and 0701 were gradually transferred into 0703 and 0705 respectively, and added to their linked numbering schemes.

Former local dialling codes
From Southampton:

924 was the local dialling code for Fareham (0329) from Southampton, which resulted in 04894 becoming unusable as an STD code.

From Winchester:

Calls to Hamble Valley exchanges were routed via Southampton except to Bishop's Waltham which had a direct connection to Winchester. The unpublished dialling code 93923 would also have worked for Bishop's Waltham with the call routed via Southampton. 93 was the local dialling code for Southampton from Winchester.

From Ryde, Isle of Wight:

Calls to Hamble Valley exchanges were routed via Southampton. 93 was the local dialling code for Southampton from Ryde. By 1979 the local dialling codes had been withdrawn and the full STD codes for the exchanges were required.

From Petersfield:

Full STD codes were required in 1971 which implied that no direct connections existed between Petersfield and the Hamble Valley exchanges.

References

1489
Hampshire